Muara Beliti Baru is a subdistrict of Muara Beliti in the Musi Rawas Regency of South Sumatra, Indonesia.

References

Populated places in South Sumatra